The Mail Robber is a 1925 short Australian film made by Greg Palmer when he was fifteen.

Part of the film survives today.

Plot
A robber steals a mail bag and is chased through a park.

Production
Palmer took five years to raise the money.

Reception
The film made £650 in profit.

References

External links
The Mail Robber at National Film and Sound Archive

1925 films
Australian comedy short films
Australian silent films